Two ships of Bangladesh Navy carried the name BNS Shaheed Daulat:
 , a Type 062 class gunboat acquired from China.

Bangladesh Navy ship names